Selenogyrus brunneus is a species of tarantula (family Theraphosidae, subfamily Selenogyrinae), found in West Africa (likely Togo).

Characteristics
S. brunneus is brown with greyish-olive green hairs and is about 50mm long. Foveal groove procurved. Embrik Strand gave no further details in his description of the species (other than the eye arrangement and spination).

References

Theraphosidae
Spiders of Africa
Spiders described in 1907